Saint Helena Unified School District is a school district headquartered in Saint Helena, California.

 the superintendent is Marylou Wilson. Its National Center for Education Statistics (NCES) ID is 0637830.

Schools
 Saint Helena High School
 Robert Louis Stevenson Middle School - Circa 2020 it had about 288 students.
 Saint Helena Elementary School - Circa 2020 it had 229 students, and/or 236 students.
 Saint Helena Primary School - Circa 2020 it had 238 students.

References

External links
 
 
School districts in California
School districts in Napa County, California